Lawrence Richardson Jossenberger (May 31, 1894 – August 4, 1935) who worked under the stage name Larry Rich, was a vaudeville comedian.

Biography
He was born in Fort Worth, Texas on May 31, 1894 to Victor Jossenberger and Helen Samantha Richardson. He died on August 4, 1935 in Jamaica, Queens, New York. He was buried in Kensico Cemetery.

References

1894 births
1935 deaths
People from Fort Worth, Texas
Comedians from Texas
Burials at Kensico Cemetery